The Catholic Conference is a Massachusetts high school athletic conference whose member institutions are located primarily in Eastern part of Massachusetts. Its ten members include only all-boys and all-girls Catholic high schools. The Catholic Conference participates in the Massachusetts Interscholastic Athletic Association (MIAA) Division I in sports competitions.

The Catholic Conference is regarded as one of the most accomplished sports conferences in terms of its winning reputation, with 17 state football championships, 9 basketball championships, 34 ice hockey championships, and 15 swimming championships.

Member schools

Current members
The Catholic Conference consists of 10 member institutions located primarily in Eastern Massachusetts. The geographic domain of the conference stretches from Shrewsbury in the west to Hingham in the east and from Danvers in the north to Westwood in the south. 

On July 1, 2021, St. John's High School of Shrewsbury formally joined the Catholic Conference as the sixth boys' school. The Pioneers played the 2020–21 season in the Catholic Conference bubble due to the COVID–19 pandemic.

Since July 1, 2021, the 10 members of the Catholic Conference are:

Former members

Ice hockey 
The Catholic Conference boasts very strong hockey programs. The conference has combined to win the Super 8 Hockey Tournament 22 times since its inception in 1991. Catholic Memorial has won the tournament 13 times, Boston College High School has won 6 times, and Malden Catholic has won 5 times.

Super 8 Championships

Rivalries

References

'

 
Massachusetts Interscholastic Athletic Association leagues
Catholic sports organizations